The House of Representatives (Bosnian: Predstavnički Dom, Croatian: Zastupnički Dom and Serbian Cyrillic: Представнички Дом) is one of the two chambers of the Parliamentary Assembly of Bosnia and Herzegovina, with the other being the House of Peoples of Bosnia and Herzegovina. The chamber consists of 42 members which are elected by party-list proportional representation. 28 members are elected from the Federation of Bosnia and Herzegovina, and 14 from Republika Srpska. Members serve for terms of four years. The current membership of the chamber was elected on 2 October 2022.

Electoral system
The house is elected by party-list proportional representation with open lists. For the first two elections, representatives were elected from nationwide lists, but in 2000, local representation was introduced. Eight constituencies, known as electoral units, each elect between three and six representatives, giving a total of 30. To ensure proportionality, a further 12 representatives are elected on a entity-wide basis. Each entity is allocated a number of these entity-wide seats, 7 members from the Federation of Bosnia and Herzegovina and 5 from Republika Srpska. When a party is entitled to one of these entity-wide seats, it is given to the candidate from the party who receives the most votes without being elected in his or her electoral unit, located in one of the two entities.

Brčko District voters are entitled to vote in only one of the two entities. Their vote is allocated to the corresponding electoral unit, depending on which entity the voter is voting from.

Current composition
<noinclude>

Chairmen of the House of Representatives

See also
Politics of Bosnia and Herzegovina
Parliamentary Assembly of Bosnia and Herzegovina
House of Peoples of Bosnia and Herzegovina

References

Parliamentary Assembly of Bosnia and Herzegovina
Bosnia and Herzegovina
Bosnia and Herzogovina parliaments